Joseph Adrien Henri Lambert (15 July 1913 – 23 July 2003) was a Canadian farmer and politician.  Lambert was a Social Credit Party of Canada member of the House of Commons of Canada. He was born in Saint-Adrien-d'Irlande, Quebec and became a farmer by career.

Lambert was defeated in early attempts to win the Lotbinière electoral district as an independent candidate in 1949 and 1965.

He won the Bellechasse electoral district in the 1968 federal election, initially as a Ralliement créditiste candidate. His party rejoined the Social Credit Party of Canada in 1971, under which he was re-elected at Bellechasse in 1972, 1974 and 1979.

Lambert served successive terms from the 28th to 31st Canadian Parliaments after which he was defeated by Alain Garant of the Liberal party in the 1980 federal election.

Electoral record (partial)

External links
 
 
 genealogy.com: Adrien Lambert obituary

1913 births
2003 deaths
Members of the House of Commons of Canada from Quebec
Social Credit Party of Canada MPs